Guaranda is a town and municipality located in the Sucre Department, northern Colombia.

Climate
Guaranda has a tropical monsoon climate (Am) with heavy rainfall in all months except January.

References
 Gobernacion de Sucre - Guaranda
 Guaranda official website 

Sucre